Canadian war memorials are buildings, monuments, and statues that commemorate the armed actions in the territory encompassing modern Canada, the role of the Canadian military in conflicts and peacekeeping operations, and Canadians who died or were injured in a war. Much of this military history of Canada is commemorated today with memorials across the country and around the world. Canadian memorials commemorate the sacrifices made as early as the Seven Years' War to the modern day War on Terror. As Newfoundland was a British Dominion until joining Confederation in 1949, there are several monuments in Newfoundland and Labrador and abroad which were dedicated to Newfoundland servicemen and women. 

There are currently 6,293 war memorials in Canada registered with the National Inventory of Military Memorials, which is under the Canadian Department of Veterans Affairs. There are also war memorials across the world, some of which are operated by the Commonwealth War Graves Commission, which are dedicated to Canada as well as the Commonwealth members. There currently are 17 in France, six in Belgium, four in the United Kingdom, two in Afghanistan and South Korea, and one each in Egypt, Hong Kong, Italy, Malta, the Netherlands, Singapore, Turkey, and the United Arab Emirates.

There are few examples of memorial art created by Indigenous peoples before the late nineteenth century. One of the best-preserved memorials is in Áísínai’pi, or Writing-on-Stone Provincial Park, in southern Alberta. This UNESCO World Heritage Site houses an extensive series of small-scale petroglyphs incised on the sandstone bluffs of the Milk River, a number of them dating to thousands of years ago.

War memorials in Canada

Colonial period
There exists a number of memorials commemorating events that occurred prior to Canadian Confederation in 1867. In addition to pre-Confederation war memorials, a number of communities in Ontario also have cannons originating from the Crimean War. However, these cannons are war trophies gifted to various communities in Upper Canada after the conflict; and do not serve as a memorial. Prior to the twentieth century, Canadian memorials were dedicated to great leaders and victories, not the named deaths of ordinary service personnel.

North-West Rebellion and the Boer War

First and Second World Wars
The war memorial sculptors at work in Canada in the years following the First World War include: Emanuel Hahn, George W. Hill, Frank Norbury, Walter Allward, Hamilton MacCarthy, Coeur de Lion MacCarthy, Alfred Howell, Sydney March, Elizabeth Wyn Wood, Henri Hebert, J. Massey Rhind, Hubert Garnier, Nicholas Pirotton, Charles Adamson, Frances Loring, and Ivor Lewis.

1945 – present

Generic war memorials

War memorials overseas

First World War

Second World War – present

Legacy
The 31 paintings of Canadian War Memorials by F.A. (Tex) Dawson were unveiled just outside Currie Hall in the Mackenzie Building at Royal Military College of Canada in Kingston on Wednesday 7 April 2010. Jack Pike, the chairman of the Royal Military College of Canada Museum's board of directors, said they had found a permanent and appropriate home. "We are delighted to have these paintings," he said in front of the assemblage of paintings, each representing a different memorial in a different setting and different seasons. "These are symbolic of sacrifice and remembrance and they do the whole thing so well."

See also

 Canadian War Museum
 List of Canadian Victoria Cross recipients
 List of Royal Military College of Canada Memorials and traditions
 List of conflicts in Canada

References

Further reading

External links

 Memorials to Canadians' Achievements & Sacrifices
 National Inventory of Canadian Military Memorials (NICMM)

War memorials
Military memorials and cemeteries
Canadian military memorials and cemeteries